Pseudorbis is a genus of sea snails, marine gastropod mollusks in the family Skeneidae.

Species
Species within the genus Pseudorbis include:
 † Pseudorbis carinifera Lozouet, 1999
 † Pseudorbis falunica Lozouet, 1999
 Pseudorbis granulum (Brugnone, 1873)
 Pseudorbis jameoensis (Rubio & Rodriguez Babio, 1991)

References

 Rubio F. & Rodriguez Babio C. (1991 ["1990"]) Sobre la posición sistemática de Pseudorbis granulum Brugnone, 1873 (Mollusca, Archeogastropoda, Skeneidae) y descripción de Pseudorbis jameoensis n. sp., procedente de las Islas Canarias. Iberus 9(1-2): 203-207.
 Gofas, S.; Le Renard, J.; Bouchet, P. (2001). Mollusca, in: Costello, M.J. et al. (Ed.) (2001). European register of marine species: a check-list of the marine species in Europe and a bibliography of guides to their identification. Collection Patrimoines Naturels, 50: pp. 180–213
 Rubio F., Rolán E. & Fernández-Garcés R. (2015). Revision of the genera Parviturbo and Pseudorbis (Gastropoda, Skeneidae). Iberus. 33(2): 167-259
 Lozouet P. Nouvelles espèces de gastéropodes (Mollusca: Gastropoda) de l'Oligocène et du Miocène inférieur d'Aquitaine (sud-ouest de la France). Partie 2. Cossmanniana. 6: 1-68. (1999).

External links
 Monterosato, T. A. di. (1884). Nomenclatura generica e specifica di alcune conchiglie mediterranee. Virzi, printed for the Author, Palermo, 152 pp.

 
Skeneidae
Gastropod genera